Victor Ion Popa (July 29, 1895 in Bârlad – March 30, 1946 in Bucharest) was a Romanian dramatist.

He went to primary school in the village of Călmăţui, a village in the Grivița commune, in the former Tutova County, where his father was a schoolteacher. At Iași he finished his first five years of junior high/high school at the Costache Negruzzi Boarding High School and his last two years of high school at the National High School, graduating in 1914. He enrolled in the Iași Conservatory and for a time in the Law Faculty of the University of Iași.

The play was set in Podeni, one of the neighborhoods of Bârlad.

Plays:
 Ciuta, 1922
 Mușcata din fereastră, 1928
 Take, Ianke şi Cadîr, 1932
 Acord familiar
 Cuiul lui Pepelea
Răzbunarea sufleurului
 Răspântia cea mare

Novel: 
 “Sfârlează cu fofează” (Spinner with propeller)

The Victor Ion Popa Theatre (Teatrul Victor Ion Popa) in Bârlad was dedicated in his honor.

Notes
 

1895 births
1946 deaths
People from Bârlad
20th-century Romanian dramatists and playwrights
20th-century Romanian writers